The Integrated Space Cell was the nodal agency within the Government of India which oversees the security of its space based military and civilian hardware systems. It was to be jointly operated by all the three services of the Indian Armed Forces, the civilian Defence Research and Development Organisation and the Indian Space Research Organisation (ISRO). This agency was Superseded by Defence Space Agency.

Description
The Integrated Space Cell had been set up to utilise more effectively the country's space-based assets for military purposes and to look into threats to these assets. It functioned under the Integrated Defense Services headquarters of the Indian Ministry of Defense. This command leveraged space technology including satellites. Unlike an aerospace command, where the air force controls most of its activities, the Integrated Space Cell envisaged cooperation and coordination between the three services as well as civilian agencies dealing with space. The armed forces are increasingly depending on satellites for communication, aircraft and missile guidance, reconnaissance and surveillance. Satellites are also essential for civilian purposes such as weather forecasting, disaster management and communications. This had made it important to work out measures to protect India's space-based assets.

Formation
The formation of an Integrated Space Cell was announced on 10 June 2010 by the former Defence Minister A. K. Antony who said it was being established because of "the growing threat" to India's space assets. "Offensive counter-space systems like anti-satellite weaponry, new classes of heavy-lift and small boosters and an improved array of military space systems have emerged in our neighbourhood" stressing that these need to be countered. Announcing its setting up, Antony said while India remains committed to non-weaponisation of space, emergence of offensive counter space systems and anti-satellite weaponry posed new threats which had to be countered. The defense minister's announcement comes about 16 months after India's then chief of air staff, Air Chief Marshal Shashi Tyagi, told the media that India was "in the process of setting up an aerospace command to exploit outer space by integrating its capabilities". The Integrated Space Cell has apparently been operational for six months before its formal announcement by Defence Minister Shri. A. K. Antony.

The announcement came less than a month after China used a medium-range ballistic missile to shoot down one of its own aging satellites, a Chinese Fengyun 1C polar orbit weather satellite that it had launched into orbit in 1999. With that, China displayed to the world that it had the technology to knock out a satellite in space, expertise that only two other countries - Russia and the United States have. On 27 March 2019 India also demonstrated this technology by knocking one of its own satellites, making it the fourth nation after U.S, Russia and China to do so. But there are broader reasons behind its formation, especially with the Indian Armed Forces relying more on space-based assets for communication, reconnaissance and surveillance.

Military satellites

As of December 2018, the IRS system is the largest constellation of remote sensing satellites for civilian use in operation today in the world which also has the dual military use, with 14 operational satellites including the latest at least 4 dedicated military use (GSAT-7, GSAT-6 and GSAT-7A, EMISAT by DRDO), however GSAT-6A which was launched as a dedicated satellite for army lost communication after its launch, and HySIS and Microsat-R satellites as of 24 January 2019 are dual use satellite available to military also. Of the 900+ operational satellites, there are 320 dual use or dedicated military satellite in the sky, half of which are owned by United States alone, followed by Russia, China and India (14) as of 24 January 2018. All these Indian satellites are placed in polar sun-synchronous orbit and provide data in a variety of spatial, spectral and temporal resolutions. Though most are not meant to be dedicated military satellites, some have a spatial resolution of 1 metre or below which can be also used for military applications. The following is a noteworthy list of satellites:

Anti-satellite weapons 

 Microsat-R satellite was launched and it served as a target for Indian anti-satellite weapon experiment in which it was successfully destroyed by India's anti-satellite missile.

Military satellites in use

 Technology Experiment Satellite or (TES) is an experimental satellite to demonstrate and validate, in orbit, technologies that could be used in the future satellites of Indian Space Research Organisation (ISRO). The Technology Experiment Satellite (TES) has a panchromatic camera capable of producing images of 1 meter resolution for remote sensing. The launch of TES made India the second country in the world after the United States that can commercially offer images with one meter resolution. It is used for remote sensing of civilian areas, mapping industry and geographical information services.
 RISAT-2, or Radar Imaging Satellite 2 has a primary sensor, the synthetic aperture radar from Israel Aerospace Industries (IAI). RISAT-2 is India's first satellite with a synthetic aperture radar. It has a day-night, all-weather monitoring capability and has a resolution of one metre. Potential applications include tracking hostile ships at sea. Though the Indian Space Research Organisation sought to underplay the satellite's defence capabilities in its website and in its announcements, a majority of the media preferred to classify it as a spy satellite. ISRO claims that the satellite will enhance ISRO's capability for earth observation, especially during floods, cyclones, landslides and in disaster management in a more effective way.
 CARTOSAT-2 carries a state-of-the-art panchromatic (PAN) camera that take black and white pictures of the earth in the visible region of the electromagnetic spectrum. The swath covered by these high resolution PAN cameras is 9.6 km and their spatial resolution is 80 centimetres. The satellite can be steered up to 45 degrees along as well as across the track. CARTOSAT-2 is an advanced remote sensing satellite capable of providing scene-specific spot imagery. The data from the satellite will be used for detailed mapping and other cartographic applications at cadastral level, urban and rural infrastructure development and management, as well as applications in Land Information System (LIS) and Geographical Information System (GIS). Cartosat was decommissioned and the perigee lowered by controlled burns between March to Sep 2020 as debris mitigation activities. This will result in the orbit naturally decaying and re-entry within 10 years
 CARTOSAT-2A is a dedicated satellite for the Indian Armed Forces. The satellite carries a panchromatic (PAN) camera capable of taking black-and-white pictures in the visible region of electromagnetic spectrum. The highly agile Cartosat-2A can be steered up to 45 deg along as well as across the direction of its movement to facilitate imaging of any area more frequently.
 CARTOSAT-2B carries a panchromatic (PAN) camera capable of taking black-and-white pictures in the visible region of electromagnetic spectrum which has a resolution of 80 centimetres. The highly agile CARTOSAT-2B can be steered up to 45 deg along as well as across the direction of its movement to facilitate imaging of any area more frequently and offers multiple spot scene imagery.
 GSAT-6A is a dedicated satellite for army as a replacement for GSAT-6 which lost communication after its launch.
 GSAT-7 was launched in 2013 for the exclusive use of the Indian Navy to monitor the Indian Ocean Region (IOR) with the satellite's 2,000 nautical mile ‘footprint’ and real-time input capabilities to Indian warships, submarines and maritime aircraft. To boost its network-centric operations, the IAF is also likely to get another satellite GSAT-7C within a few years.
 HySIS, a dual use satellite, was also launched in November 2013, which is used by the navy. HySIS carries two payloads, the first in the Visible Near Infrared (VNIR) spectral range of 0.4 to 0.95 micrometers with 60 contiguous spectral bands and the second in the Shortwave Infrared Range (SWIR) spectral range of 0.85 to 2.4 micrometres with a 10 nanometre bandwidth and 256 contiguous spectral bands. The satellite will have a spatial resolution of 30 meters and a swath of 30 km from its 630 km sun-synchronous orbit.
 GSAT-7A, launched in December 2018 for the exclusive military use for the Indian Air Force, GSAT-7A, an advanced military communications satellite exclusively for the Indian Air Force, is similar to Indian navy's GSAT-7, and GSAT-7A will enhance Network-centric warfare capabilities of the Indian Air Force by interlinking different ground radar stations, ground airbase and Airborne early warning and control (AWACS) aircraft such as Beriev A-50 Phalcon and DRDO AEW&CS. GSAT-7A will also be used by Indian Army's Aviation Corps for its helicopters and UAV's operations.
 HySIS, dual use satellite launched in 2018 is also accessible to India's defence forces.
 Microsat-R satellite, a dedicated military satellite for the Indian Armed Forces, was launched on 24 January 2019. The 760 kg imaging satellite was launched using PSLV C-44 rocket.
 EMISAT, launched on 1 April 2019, is a reconnaissance satellite under DRDO's project Kautilya which will provide space-based electronic intelligence or ELINT, especially to improve the situational awareness of the Indian Armed Forces by providing information and location of enemy radars.

Requirement for additional military satellites 

As aftermath of 2020 China–India skirmishes, the Indian security agencies have requested the government for additional four to six satellites with high resolution sensors and cameras to keep an eye on individuals and small objections on and across Line of Actual Control.

Anti Satellite Weapon Test

On 27 March 2019, Indian Prime Minister Narendra Modi announced the successful launch of India's first ASAT. The interceptor was able to strike a test satellite at a 300-kilometre (186 mi) altitude in low earth orbit (LEO), thus successfully testing its ASAT missile. The interceptor was launched at around 05:40 UTC at the Integrated Test Range (ITR) in Chandipur, Odisha and hit its target Microsat-R after 168 seconds. The operation was named Mission Shakti. The missile system was developed by the Defence Research and Development Organisation (DRDO)—a research wing of the Indian defence services. With this test, India became the fourth nation with anti-satellite missile capabilities. India stated that this capability is a deterrent and is not directed against any nation.

See also 
 Armed Forces Special Operations Division
 Defence Cyber Agency
 Integrated Defence Staff
 Indian Nuclear Command Authority
 Strategic Forces Command
 Special Forces of India
 List of Indian Air Force stations
 List of Indian Navy bases
 India's overseas military bases
 Joint warfare

References

External links
 Now, space cell to keep an eye on China's plans
 India to set up tri-service Aerospace Command

Military of India
Space agencies
2010 establishments in India